The Forger (also known as Carmel-by-the-Sea) is a 2011 American drama film about art forgery. It stars Josh Hutcherson, Hayden Panettiere, Alfred Molina, Dina Eastwood and Lauren Bacall in her final film role. The film is produced by Michael-Ryan Fletchall and Craig Comstock, directed by Lawrence Roeck, and written by Carlos De Los Rios.

Plot

Joshua Mason (Josh Hutcherson) is a troubled 15-year-old who is abandoned by his mother at a motel in Carmel-by-the-Sea in California. The story begins with Joshua finishing a painting at an old mission and selling it for $50, only to be caught by the artist who had left the painting on an easel.  He returns to his motel room but the motel manager comes to collect payment and Joshua runs out the back door.  A social worker, Vanessa Reese, visits the motel and discover that the boy has painted some amazing art on the walls, mirror and ceiling. Joshua, meanwhile, chats with a girl, Amber (Hayden Panettiere), through a school yard fence. When one of the school's faculty grabs her by the arm to take her to the principal's office, Joshua climbs the fence and pulls Amber from the teacher's grip only to be confronted by two boys - one of them her brother Ryan, who thinks she's being harassed. When it starts to rain, he hides in a culvert but gets caught in the flowing water. His hand is cut as he falls out of the culvert into the sea/coast below.
 
Joshua finds a large sea-side mansion and enters through a side door that's been left open, 'breaks' in. He showers, cleans up his cut and now starving, makes himself a large sandwich. While exploring the mansion, he finds an art studio with a painting that is half complete (being copied from a photo) and finishes it before falling asleep. When he awakens he's confronted by the police and taken to child services. He tells the social worker that he doesn't know where his mother is.

Back at the mansion, the owner, Everly (Alfred Molina), finds the now-finished painting and believes the boy has real talent since he had been unable to find anyone to complete the portrait, let alone do it with such complete accuracy. Everly decides to take in the boy thinking that he might be able to exploit his art talent. 

During a charity art benefit, Joshua meets a kind old woman named Anne-Marie Cole (Lauren Bacall). He also meets Ryan, Amber's brother, and the two make up and talk about Anne-Marie and how she's indeed cool but also loaded.

That night, Joshua breaks into Anne-Marie's home and goes through some of her things. Anne-Marie discovers Joshua in the room and after a brief conversation she calls Everly to come and collect him.

The next day Joshua and Amber talk on the beach and he kisses her without warning. She pushes him off. Later on the same beach he finds a large black dog that belongs to Anne-Marie. He takes Matilda home to Anne-Marie and the two of them talk.

Joshua goes to Amber's and apologizes and she teaches him how to "properly" kiss a girl.

Meanwhile, Everly has sold the painting that Joshua had completed earlier but needs to complete a Winslow Homer in just a couple of weeks or lose his art galleries along with everything he owns. He decides to take a risk and use the boy seeing as he is the only one who could complete the portrait accurately and on time.  Joshua attends a party that Amber is throwing and sees her in the arms of another guy but while confronting him, he is held back by Ryan. Joshua and Ryan fight. Joshua goes to Anne-Marie's where she tends to his wounds.  

Back at Everly's, Joshua confronts Everly about his forgery scheme and how for $500 he will keep his mouth shut. Everly gives him a different proposition:  If he does one more painting he will get half the money made from it - a possibility of millions. Joshua, amazed, says yes. For a week he learns what forgers have to do so their paintings pass as authentic. When the painting is finished, Joshua and Everly have an unpleasant conversation. Joshua, having second thoughts, then takes the painting from the house and hides it.

Meanwhile, Vanessa finds Joshua's mother living with her boyfriend and a child. Vanessa then calls child protective services to rescue the child. She learns more about Joshua, who was abused, and about the tragedy Anne-Marie experienced.

Joshua goes to Anne-Marie's after hearing a rumor from Everly that she was once a forger.  He goes through her stuff and finds a forger's hammer and a newspaper clipping about how she was suspected of art forgeries. He then runs away feeling that he cannot trust anyone.

Vanessa then meets with Joshua and tells him she could not find his mother. Joshua then breaks down in tears feeling that he is unwanted.

Joshua and Amber make up. Anne-Marie goes to Everly's to talk to Joshua and finds the door unlocked. She goes in and wanders into the art studio where she learns that Joshua has stolen the painting, as well as the truth about what Everly did. Joshua then goes to the art exhibit and returns the painting but before he leaves, Anne-Marie in front of everybody, slices the portrait and tells everyone that it was a forgery and that she at one time painted one of Everly's forgeries and has regretted it ever since. The portrait is confirmed to be a forgery when an underpainting of Dennis the Menace is revealed.

In the end, Joshua agrees to Anne-Marie's request and lives with her, and is also in a relationship with Amber. He states that, "I wasn't sure what I was looking for at first when I broke into Anne-Marie's house, but now I know. I was looking for a place to belong."

Cast
 Josh Hutcherson as Joshua Mason
 Hayden Panettiere as Amber Felter
 Lauren Bacall as Anne-Marie Cole
 Alfred Molina as Everly Campbell
 Dina Eastwood as Vanessa Reese
 Billy Boyd as Bernie
 Adam Godley as Pinkus
 Alexandra Carl as Rachel
 Jansen Panettiere as Aram
 Scott Eastwood as Ryan
 Tricia Helfer as Sasha
 Alexander Poletti as Young Boy

Production
The Forger, previously titled  Carmel-by-the-Sea, marks Lawrence Roeck's debut as a feature film director. Experience Media Studios acquired the unfinished film in early 2010, and completed it by February 2011.

Filming
The film's 24-day shooting schedule finished on location in Carmel, California in February 2009, and included Carmel locals in several key scenes.

Music
"Livin," performed by Ribsy's Nickel; written by Jesse Corona & Jason Williams; published by Ribsy's Nickel Music BMI

Release
The film world premiered as Carmel-by-the-Sea at the Arclight in Hollywood, California on March 9, 2011. Following a title change to The Forger, it was released on  DVD on July 3, 2012 due to a decision to delay the release until after The Hunger Games (in which Josh Hutcherson plays a leading role) had premiered.

References

External links
 
 

2011 films
2010s teen drama films
American teen drama films
2011 directorial debut films
Films scored by James Dooley
Films set in California
Films set in the San Francisco Bay Area
Films shot in California
2011 drama films
2010s English-language films
2010s American films